Philip Corbin (born 1957) is a Barbadian FIDE Master chess player.

Corbin is a seven-time champion of Barbados and has represented Barbados in eleven Chess Olympiads from 1986 through 2008, playing first board in 1986, 1990, 1998, and 2000.

He is known for using the Elephant Gambit when playing with the black pieces, most notably in his 2006 simultaneous exhibition win over English GM Nigel Short.
He also plays the Budapest Gambit and the Scandinavian Defense as black.
 In a television interview Corbin said that he attempts to play chess in an innovative and entertaining style and referred to his playing style as "Calypso Chess."

Book
Calypso Chess: The Entertaining Chess Games (1970-2010) of Dr. Philip Corbin, FIDE Master, Barbados Paperback – 20 Aug. 2011

References

External links

1957 births
Living people
Barbadian chess players
Chess Olympiad competitors
Chess FIDE Masters